Nikka Costa is the debut studio album by Nikka Costa. It was released in 1981 by CGD Records (Italy) in conjunction with CBS Records when Costa was nine years old, fifteen years before her first album for older audiences was released, and twenty years before her breakthrough album Everybody Got Their Something.

Background 
Costa's cover of "(Out Here) On My Own", originally from the musical film Fame, was released as a single from the album. The single topped the charts in Italy and Europe. The single's success prompted suspicions that Costa would be a one-hit wonder, and that her success would be short-lived, but neither of these predictions came true. Instead, by September 1982, the album had sold over 200,000 copies in Italy alone, and about 1.5 million copies worldwide.

Tracklisting

Side One

Side Two

Sales and certifications

References

1981 debut albums
Nikka Costa albums
Columbia Records albums
CBS Records albums
Compagnia Generale del Disco albums